The Hudson Valley Renegades are a Minor League Baseball team based in Fishkill, New York. The High-A affiliate of the New York Yankees, the Renegades play in the South Atlantic League. The Renegades play their home games at Dutchess Stadium. From 1994 to 2020, the team competed in the Class A Short Season New York–Penn League.

History
The Renegades were founded in 1994 when the Erie Sailors pulled up stakes in Pennsylvania and relocated to the Hudson Valley, rebranding as the Hudson Valley Renegades. The team originally retained the Sailors' existing affiliation with the Texas Rangers organization but became an affiliate of the Tampa Bay Rays organization in 1996. The Renegades became an affiliate club of the New York Yankees in 2021.

The Renegades won three New York–Penn League championships (1999, 2012, and 2017). The organization has produced major leaguers such as Scott Podsednik, Jorge Cantu, Ryan Dempster, Joe Kennedy, Craig Monroe, Matt Diaz, Evan Longoria, Josh Hamilton, John Jaso, Wade Davis, and Toby Hall. Doug Waechter threw the only no-hitter in Renegades history on August 10, 2000, against the Pittsfield Mets. Scott Podsednik became the first former Renegade to win a World Series with the Chicago White Sox defeating a Houston Astros club which included former Renegades Brandon Backe and Dan Wheeler. On August 14, 2007, The Renegades hosted the third annual New York–Penn League All-Star Game at Dutchess Stadium.

Team promotions include a "Fun Team" that promotes between-inning entertainment. Ex-manager Matt Quatraro coined the name Gades in 2000. Their mascots are raccoons: Rookie (the Renegade) Raccoon, Rookie's wife Rene Gade, Rascal (Rookie & Rene's son), and occasionally, Rookie's father Roofus.

In conjunction with Major League Baseball's restructuring of Minor League Baseball in 2021, the Renegades were organized into the High-A East. They won the 2021 Northern Division title with a first-place 71–49 record. Despite winning the division, their record was third-best in the league, and only the two teams with the highest winning percentages in the regular season competed for the league championship.

The original owner of the team was the Goldkang Group headed by Marvin Goldklang. Goldklang also has stakes in several other minor league baseball teams, including the Charleston RiverDogs and St. Paul Saints. In December 2021, it was announced that The Goldklang Group sold the Renegades to Diamond Baseball Holdings, an organization formed by Endeavor Group Holdings which also owns the Miss Universe Organization, Professional Bull Riders and UFC.

In 2022, the High-A East became known as the South Atlantic League, the name historically used by the regional circuit prior to the 2021 reorganization.

Roster

Playoffs
1995 season: Lost to Vermont 2-0 in semifinals.
1998 season: Lost to Oneonta 2-0 in semifinals.
1999 season: Defeated Utica 2-1 in semifinals; defeated Mahoning Valley 2-1 to win championship.
2012 season: Defeated Brooklyn 2-1 in semifinals; defeated Tri-City 2-1 to win championship.
2014 season: Lost to State College 2-1 in semifinals.
2016 season: Defeated Lowell 2-0 in semifinals; lost to State College 2-0 in finals.
2017 season: Defeated Staten Island 2-1 in semifinals; defeated Vermont 2-0 to win championship.
2018 season: Defeated Auburn Doubledays  2-0 in semifinals; lost to Tri-City ValleyCats 2-0 in finals.
2019 season: Lost to Brooklyn 2-1 in semifinals.

References

Further reading

External links

 
 Statistics from Baseball-Reference

Baltimore Orioles minor league affiliates
Tampa Bay Rays minor league affiliates
New York Yankees minor league affiliates
Baseball teams established in 1994
New York–Penn League teams
Professional baseball teams in New York (state)
Fishkill, New York
Baseball teams in the New York metropolitan area
1994 establishments in New York (state)
High-A East teams
South Atlantic League teams